Seven Island Lake Nature Reserve is a nature reserve established in 1956 around Oświn Lake in north-eastern Poland, close to the border with the Kaliningrad Oblast of Russia.

Geography
The reserve is located within Warmian-Masurian Voivodeship, in Gmina Węgorzewo of Węgorzewo County.

The area is an important breeding ground for water birds, and is both a Natura 2000 EU Special Protection Area, and a Ramsar site − one of 13 such sites in Poland. 

See also

Special Protection Areas in Poland

References

Nature reserves in Poland
Parks in Warmian-Masurian Voivodeship
Węgorzewo County
Natura 2000 in Poland
Ramsar sites in Poland
Landforms of Warmian-Masurian Voivodeship